Dost Aur Dushman is a 1971 Bollywood action film directed by Chand. The film stars Vinod Khanna, Rekha and Jayshree T.

Cast
 Vinod Khanna
 Rekha
 Heena Kauser  
 Jayshree T. 
 Murad   
 Sapru
 Tabassum
Joginder
 Shiv Kumar

Soundtrack
"Sanma O Mere Pyar Ka Banayka Kaahe Rayta" - Hemlata, Mohammed Rafi
"Auu Auu Aa Aa Jab Jab Dekhu" - Mohammed Rafi
"Dil Ki Hasrat Kab Nikal Jayegi" - Asha Bhosle
"Nadan Na Ban Pachtayega Mujhe Mat Chhuna Jal Jaaya" - Asha Bhosle

References

External links
 

1971 films
1970s Hindi-language films
1971 action films
Films scored by Raj Kamal
Indian action films
Hindi-language action films